Wearsafe is an American personal safety company located in Hartford, CT. Their primary wearable technology is a device that uses bluetooth technology to connect a button-like Tag with a smartphone app. When pressed, the Tag alerts a user's selected network of the location of the emergency, as well as sending a live audio feed of the incident to a group chat function. Wearsafe's mission is to "make the world a safer place by redefining the way people seek and provide help"-- by reaching a wide variety of customers, including outdoors sportsmen and anyone looking to control their personal safety, including preventing sexual assault.

History and Mission 
Wearsafe was created in response to the Cheshire Home Invasion Murders  of 2007. The founders, David Benoit and Phillip Giancarlo, began work on the technology in 2011 with copatent providers Rick Borden, Kyle Busque and Keven Busque.  The company has received significant investments from Ravi Singh, Yogasmogo and other investors. The goal of Wearsafe Labs is to "connect students with trusted contacts, enabling them to feel safe wherever they are."  Wearsafe is designed to both aid victims in an emergency and deter attackers. According to Digital Trends, former U.S. Secret Service special agent Rich Starpoli, who served Presidents George W. Bush and Bill Clinton, says “with the knowledge that students could be wearing a Wearsafe-connected device, a college or university creates a significant deterring effect.”

Products

Tag 

The Wearsafe Tag is a small, wearable button that operates similarly to other wearable personal safety devices: by connecting to a smartphone. The device also works without a smartphone, but is limited to 200 ft (70 m) from the location. According to the Boston Globe, "Activating the Wearsafe tag not only triggers a set of alerts sent to a designated list of contacts, but sends live location information and audio from the scene and opens a 'virtual situation room' between respondents in order to coordinate help (or call 911). The 'Rewind' function [plays] audio recorded in the 60 seconds prior to activation to provide context. Whatever action taken on a call for distress, the tag vibrates the reassure the caller that help is on the way: The Wearsafe Tag buffers live audio whenever it is turned on.

App 

Wearsafe's Tag pairs with a mobile app to connect with the user's selected network. The Wearsafe Tag sends GPS coordinates and audio context to the network. In an article in Law Technology Today, Attorney N. Kane Bennett, a former Massachusetts prosecutor and current litigator in civil matters, concluded that “an audio recording from the actual incident, in real time, is incredibly powerful evidence in a criminal or civil case.” The app provides reassurance to the victim that help is on the way-- which Secret Service Agents, Navy SEALS, and CIA Agents "pointed out that people who have reassurance that help is on the way have a much, much higher probability of a successful outcome in a stressful situation."

References

Wearable devices